Kennett Memorial Airport  is a city-owned, public-use airport located one nautical mile (1.85 km) southeast of the central business district of Kennett, a city in Dunklin County, Missouri, United States. This airport is included in the National Plan of Integrated Airport Systems, which categorized it as a general aviation facility.

Although most U.S. airports use the same three-letter location identifier for the FAA and IATA, this airport is assigned TKX by the FAA and KNT by the IATA (which assigned TKX to Takaroa Airport in Takaroa, French Polynesia).

Facilities and aircraft 
Kennett Memorial Airport covers an area of 337 acres (136 ha) at an elevation of 262 feet (80 m) above mean sea level. It has two runways: 2/20 is 5,000 by 75 feet (1,524 x 23 m) with a concrete surface and 18/36 is 3,012 by 75 feet (918 x 23 m) with an asphalt surface.

For the 12-month period ending June 30, 2011, the airport had 14,550 aircraft operations, an average of 39 per day: 97% general aviation, 3% air taxi, and <1% military. At that time there were 14 aircraft based at this airport: 86% single-engine and 14% multi-engine.

See also 
 List of airports in Missouri

References

External links 
 KTKX.us
 Jewell Aviation, the fixed-base operator (FBO)
  at Missouri DOT Airport Directory
 Aerial image as of February 1994 (prior to addition of Runway 2/20) from USGS The National Map
 
 

Airports in Missouri
Transportation in Dunklin County, Missouri
Buildings and structures in Dunklin County, Missouri